Documenta 12 magazines (also the Magazine project or simply the magazines) was a central project of the 12th edition (2007) of the documenta exhibition, similar in dimensions and world outreach to the "platforms" of the previous edition. Started in 1955, documenta is one of the largest and most influential exhibitions of contemporary art, taking place every five years (since the 1972 edition) in the German city of Kassel. documenta 12 magazines, conceived and directed by Georg Schöllhammer, curator and editor-in-chief of Austrian magazine Springerin, invited over 90 publications – with different formats, media and orientations in the field of art, culture, and politics from around the world – to discuss the motifs and themes of the 2007 edition. The project opened space for artists, art critics and theoreticians to plunge into an exercise of reflection on how major contemporary issues are presented in different socio-cultural contexts. The editorial team of documenta 12 magazines, run by Georg Schöllhammer, included international writers, curators and art critics Heike Ander, Fouad Asfour, Maria Berrios, Cosmin Costinas, Cordula Daus, Hu Fang, and Keiko Sei. 

Invited two years before the exhibition (16 June–23 September 2007), the participating publications have generated over 300 articles, essays, interviews, commentaries and illustrated essays that are gathered in the documenta 12 magazines online journal, where interested readers can assemble their own individual magazine. From these contributions also came the three printed editions published by Taschen: "Modernity?"; "Life!" and "Education:", related to the three leitmotifs of documenta 12: Is modernity our antiquity?, What is bare life? and What is to be done (Education)?

This communication process continues during the hundred days of exhibition in documenta-Halle. Editors and authors participate in lectures and meetings, and magazine issues are released to the public.

Further reading 
 Dominic Eichler, Documenta 12 2007 in "Frieze", issue 104, January-February 2007.
 Elena Zanichelli, "We also expected answers that weren’t harmonious." – Interview with Georg Schöllhammer, Documenta 12.

References

External links 
 Documenta magazine project website

Magazines
2007 establishments in Germany
2007 disestablishments in Germany
Magazines established in 2012
Contemporary art magazines
Mass media in Kassel